Myristica devogelii is a species of plant in the family Myristicaceae. It is a tree endemic to Sulawesi in Indonesia.

References

devogelii
Endemic flora of Sulawesi
Trees of Sulawesi
Vulnerable plants
Taxonomy articles created by Polbot